The 108th district of the Texas House of Representatives consists of portions of northern Dallas, all of Highland Park, and all of University Park in Dallas County. The current Representative is Morgan Meyer, who has represented the district since 2014.

The district is home to Southern Methodist University in University Park.

References 

108